Nevoľné is a village and municipality in Žiar nad Hronom District in the Banská Bystrica Region of central Slovakia, 6 kilometres from Kremnica town. The village is mentioned first in archive documents in 1487.

Notable people
 Blažej Baláž, artist
 Rudolf Baláž, Roman Catholic bishop

External links 
 Nevoľné official site
 Google satellite spot of Nevoľné

Villages and municipalities in Žiar nad Hronom District